Stone Pillow is a 1985 American made-for-television drama film directed by George Schaefer and written by Rose Leiman Goldemberg. It starred Lucille Ball, in an attempt to make a dramatic "breakout" from her years in comedy, portraying an older homeless woman with few resources and even fewer options.

Plot
Carrie Lange has just begun her career in social work. She wants to make a difference but must first learn what life is really like for New York City's homeless. She meets an elderly woman named Florabelle, who makes it known she does not want company or help. Equipped with the precious cart that contains all of her belongings, Flora takes care of herself on the streets of Manhattan. Carrie wins Flora's trust after saving her cart. Flora takes her for a runaway, and Carrie plays along as Flora finds her the best food and warmest places the streets have to offer. Flora even divulges painful memories about her past life. They go to Grand Central Terminal for the night, but are separated after the police throw everyone out. Flora looks for Carrie at a shelter and is stunned to find her working there. She feels she has been betrayed. Against her will, Flora is shuttled off to a woman's shelter in Brooklyn, where she is treated poorly, and then must find her way back to Manhattan. Finding compassion difficult to come by even in those within her profession, Carrie decides she can make a difference one person at a time. Finally realizing she cannot go on living the way she does, Flora accepts Carrie's helping hand. Through Carrie's intervention, for the first time in years, Flora has a place to call home.

Cast
 Lucille Ball as Florabelle
 Daphne Zuniga as Carrie Lange
 William Converse-Roberts as Max
 Stephen Lang as Tim
 Susan Batson as Ruby
 Anna Maria Horsford as Collins
 Stefan Schnabel as Mr. Berman
 Rebecca Schull as Mrs. Nelson
 Imogene Bliss as Violet

Reception
The movie was broadcast on CBS in November 1985. The film received rather mixed reviews, but was a ratings success. The telecast ranked 9th out of 68 programs airing that week, and brought in a 23.3 rating and a 33 share. The success of the film led Ball to make one last attempt to return to her comedy roots with Life with Lucy the next year. John J. O'Connor, in his review in The New York Times, wrote: " 'Stone Pillow' is a carefully contrived concoction, earnest but not above being cute and nearly outrageous in its determination to jerk a few tears. Accepted on that level, the exercise works reasonably well.... Miss Ball is in total control, from the opening scene in which, emerging from a cocoon bed of green plastic garbage bags, she takes one look at the world and proclaims, 'Well, I'm still here.'"

References

External links
 

1985 television films
1985 films
1985 drama films
American drama television films
Films about homelessness
CBS network films
Films directed by George Schaefer
Films scored by Georges Delerue
Films set in New York City
1980s American films
1980s English-language films